Peter Paul Hartnett, aka PP Hartnett (born 1958) is a London Irish writer, spoken word performer and photographer currently based at the edge of a forest close to the coastal area of Kirkcudbrightshire, Dumfries and Galloway, Scotland. In terms of fiction, his focus is upon emotional damage, written from a moral perspective. His most notable commercial successes have been the works entitled Call Me, I Want to Fuck You, Rock 'n' Roll Suicide and Sixteen.

PP Hartnett's recent download titles include << deletion >>, Full Screen and the series SEX : MALE, published by Autopsy, that contains works such as Call Me, I Want to Fuck You, Mmm Yeah, Sixteen, Rock 'n' Roll Suicide, POZMEUP, You... and Needs Discussion.

PP Hartnett has produced two spoken word albums of his fiction, Ferris Wheel Kiss and The Very Idea. Hartnett also fronts a band named << deletion >> (formerly known as Child R*pe Photos) having released an album entitled Tripod, Camera, Self-Timer (Autopsy). The focus of the work is long-term sexual abuse within the Catholic Church. PP Hartnett was educated by the Benedictine monks of Ealing Abbey's St Benedict's School, West London.

Poetry
PP Hartnett has published a number of signed limited edition hardback works via Autopsy, such as date of birth, time of death (January 2017), three men, in tears (July, 2017), gentle and tender, act of confession (May, 2018), with works i shouldn't, must stop (January 2019).

Spoken word
2018 releases include schoolboysoul and none of god's business, a two-track download spoken word double A-side (January 2018), and gentle and tender, act of confession, a five-track download spoken word EP (March, 2018).

Subversive works
Unusually, Dennis Nilsen has provided the illustrations for much of Hartnett's work, such as within SEX : MALE and Full Screen. The spoken word album  accompanied his last book, a roman a clef entitled << deletion >>, was banned by Tunecore for its content – a fictional television documentary detailing four accounts of child abuse by Catholic priests within a fictional Catholic school in West London. Apple's iBooks Store went on to reject Full Screen as containing prohibited explicit or objectionable content, as reported in Keighley News and Telegraph & Argus.

Photography
Peter Paul Hartnett initially made his name as a photographer on the underground LGBT club scene, developing and printing his own work. Hartnett took his first nightclub photograph of punk icon Soo Catwoman at Bang Disco, London, in October 1976. He worked at London hotspots such as Leigh Bowery's Taboo, publishing his photography in publications such as i-D, Dazed & Confused, V-Man, Vision, XLR8R, Fused, The Observer Magazine, The Independent Magazine, The Sunday Telegraph Magazine and The Sunday Times Magazine, among others.

Hartnett's access to non-mainstream alternative spaces offered a view into a previously unseen part of this undocumented subculture. Although his work was journalistic in approach, he claims he has always attempted to capture real life from a moral perspective, saying, 'I tend not to take photographs that are in any way manipulative or exploitative. When I have, for example, photographed someone who has been drunk or drug-fucked, I will often edit these out of a presentation as they can be demeaning. I do not do nudes. Sometimes I have photographed dancers who look so lost, and these images tend not to get published as I feel a camera can be invasive and that is not my intention. I feel very protective about my subjects.'

Hartnett regularly documents London Fashion Week, Graduate Fashion Week, Free Range, plus music festivals, with his favourite being the annual Rebellion Punk Festival.

As a collector of vintage photography, Hartnett has until very recently been a major contributor to the Photographic Youth Music Culture Archive, with his work now represented by Lee Dalton at Photoshot / Avalon.

His broadcasting work has included MTV, VH1, RTL, BBC, Channel 4 and Discovery / TLC.

Awards and honours
Hartnett has won a North West Arts Award.

In 2007, Hartnett was also declared winner of The Manchester Monologues Manchester Metropolitan University Literary Competition, in collaboration with Urbis Offcut at The Manchester Fringe Festival.

References

External links
 An interview at Bent Magazine
 'Hartnett returns and has the Catholic church in his sights' at Vada Magazine
 An interview at The Independent
 Feature at Reflekt Magazine
 London Fashion Week photography by PP Hartnett writing as Paul Hartnett in Metro
 'Sexual abuse addressed in a new novel' at Telegraph & Argus
 'Hartnett: Raw Power, Real Fiction' at Vada Magazine
 'From Fashion Week to Fiction Freak' at Fused magazine
 'Interview with PP Hartnett' (pp.82-88) at GCN
 'Poetry and Predators | PP Hartnett' at Northern Life Magazine
 'The collected works of author PP Hartnett' at WhatsOn
 'book review: date of birth, time of death: pp hartnett' at Gscene
 'Haworth man attacks "failings" of Catholic school after former priest found guilty of sexual abuse' at Keighley News
 'Life after death for Haworth poet PP Hartnett' at Craven Herald
 'SEX : MALE THE COLLECTED WORKS OF PP HARTNETT' at Fused
 'Review: three men in tears' (p.49) at Gscene
 'PP Hartnett: three men, in tears' at Bradford Equity Partnership
 'Pervert's Poetry?' at ''QX Magazine'
 hartnett.uk.com

Living people
1958 births
English gay writers
English LGBT novelists
20th-century English novelists
English short story writers
21st-century British novelists
People from Ealing
Irish novelists
Irish male writers
English male short story writers
English male novelists
20th-century British short story writers
21st-century British short story writers
20th-century English male writers
21st-century English male writers